In Greek mythology, Hypnos (Ancient Greek:  means 'sleep') also spelled Hypnus is the personification of sleep; the Roman equivalent is known as Somnus. His name is the origin of the word hypnosis. Pausanias wrote that Hypnos was a dearest friend of the Muses.

Description
Hypnos is usually the fatherless son of Nyx ("The Night"), although sometimes Nyx's consort Erebus ("The Darkness") is named as his father. His twin brother is Thanatos ("Death"). Both siblings live in the underworld (Hades). According to rumors, Hypnos lived in a big cave, which the river Lethe ("Forgetfulness") comes from and where night and day meet. His bed is made of ebony, on the entrance of the cave grow a number of poppies and other soporific plants. No light and no sound would ever enter his grotto. According to Homer, he lives on the island Lemnos, which later on has been claimed to be his very own dream-island. He is said to be a calm and gentle god, as he helps humans in need and, due to their sleep, owns half of their lives.

Family
Hypnos lived next to his twin brother, Thanatos (Θάνατος, "death") in the Underworld, where the rays of the sun never reach them.

Hypnos' mother was Nyx (Νύξ, "Night"), the goddess of Night, without a father. However, sometimes he was the son of Nyx and Erebus, the god of Darkness. Nyx was a dreadful and powerful goddess, and even Zeus feared to enter her realm.

His wife, Pasithea, was one of the youngest of the Charites and was promised to him by Hera, who is the goddess of marriage and birth. Pasithea is the goddess of hallucination or relaxation.

Mythology

Hypnos in the Iliad 

Hypnos used his powers to trick Zeus. Hypnos was able to trick him and help the Danaans win the Trojan War. During the war, Hera loathed her brother and husband, Zeus, so she devised a plot to trick him. She decided that in order to trick him she needed to make him so enamoured with her that he would fall for the trick. So she washed herself with ambrosia and anointed herself with oil, made especially for her to make herself impossible for Zeus to resist. She wove flowers through her hair, put on three brilliant pendants for earrings, and donned a wondrous robe. She then called for Aphrodite, the goddess of love, and asked her for a charm that would ensure that her trick would not fail. In order to procure the charm, however, she lied to Aphrodite because they sided on opposite sides of the war. She told Aphrodite that she wanted the charm to help herself and Zeus stop fighting. Aphrodite willingly agreed. Hera was almost ready to trick Zeus, but she needed the help of Hypnos, who had tricked Zeus once before.

Hera called on Hypnos and asked him to help her by putting Zeus to sleep. Hypnos was reluctant because the last time he had put the god to sleep, he was furious when he awoke. It was Hera who had asked him to trick Zeus the first time as well. She was furious that Heracles, Zeus' son, sacked the city of the Trojans. So she had Hypnos put Zeus to sleep, and set blasts of angry winds upon the sea while Heracles was still sailing home. When Zeus awoke he was furious and went on a rampage looking for Hypnos. Hypnos managed to avoid Zeus by hiding with his mother, Nyx. This made Hypnos reluctant to accept Hera's proposal and help her trick Zeus again. Hera first offered him a beautiful golden seat that can never fall apart and a footstool to go with it. He refused this first offer, remembering the last time he tricked Zeus. Hera finally got him to agree by promising that he would be married to Pasithea, one of the youngest Graces, whom he had always wanted to marry. Hypnos made her swear by the river Styx and call on gods of the underworld to be witnesses so that he would be ensured that he would marry Pasithea.

Hera went to see Zeus on Gargarus, the topmost peak of Mount Ida. Zeus was extremely taken by her and suspected nothing as Hypnos was shrouded in a thick mist and hidden upon a pine tree that was close to where Hera and Zeus were talking. Zeus asked Hera what she was doing there and why she had come from Olympus, and she told him the same lie she told Aphrodite. She told him that she wanted to go help her parent stop quarrelling and she stopped there to consult him because she didn't want to go without his knowledge and have him be angry with her when he found out. Zeus said that she could go any time, and that she should postpone her visit and stay there with him so they could enjoy each other's company. He told her that he was never in love with anyone as much as he loved her at that moment. He took her in his embrace and Hypnos went to work putting him to sleep, with Hera in his arms. While this went on, Hypnos travelled to the ships of the Achaeans to tell Poseidon, God of the Sea, that he could now help the Danaans and give them a victory while Zeus was sleeping. This is where Hypnos leaves the story, leaving Poseidon eager to help the Danaans. Thanks to Hypnos helping to trick Zeus, the war changed its course to Hera's favour, and Zeus never found out that Hypnos had tricked him one more time.

Hypnos and Endymion 
According to a passage in Deipnosophistae, the sophist and dithyrambic poet Licymnius of Chios tells a different tale about the Endymion myth, in which Hypnos loves Endymion and does not close the eyes of his beloved even while he is asleep, but lulls him to rest with eyes wide open so that he may without interruption enjoy the pleasure of gazing at them.

Hypnos in art

Hypnos appears in numerous works of art, most of which are vases. An example of one vase that Hypnos is featured on is called "Ariadne Abandoned by Theseus," which is part of the Museum of Fine Arts in Boston's collection. In this vase, Hypnos is shown as a winged god dripping Lethean water upon the head of Ariadne as she sleeps.

One of the most famous works of art featuring Hypnos is a bronze head of Hypnos himself, now kept in the British Museum in London. This bronze head has wings sprouting from his temples and the hair is elaborately arranged, some tying in knots and some hanging freely from his head.

Words derived from Hypnos
The English word "hypnosis" is derived from his name, referring to the fact that when hypnotized, a person is put into a sleep-like state (hypnos "sleep" + -osis "condition"). The class of medicines known as "hypnotics" which induce sleep also take their name from Hypnos.

See also

 Aergia, a goddess of sloth and attendant of Hypnos
 Morpheus, god of dreams

References

Bibliography 
 Athenaeus, The Learned Banqueters, Volume V: Books 10.420e-11, edited and translated by S. Douglas Olson, Loeb Classical Library No. 274, Cambridge, Massachusetts, Harvard University Press, 2009. . Online version at Harvard University Press.
 Cicero, Marcus Tullius, De Natura Deorum in Cicero: On the Nature of the Gods. Academics, translated by H. Rackham, Loeb Classical Library No. 268, Cambridge, Massachusetts, Harvard University Press, first published 1933, revised 1951. . Online version at Harvard University Press. Internet Archive.
 Hesiod, Theogony, in The Homeric Hymns and Homerica with an English Translation by Hugh G. Evelyn-White, Cambridge, MA., Harvard University Press; London, William Heinemann Ltd. 1914. Online version at the Perseus Digital Library.
 Homer, The Iliad with an English Translation by A.T. Murray, PhD in two volumes. Cambridge, MA., Harvard University Press; London, William Heinemann, Ltd. 1924. Online version at the Perseus Digital Library.
 Hyginus, Gaius Julius, Fabulae in Apollodorus' Library and Hyginus' Fabulae: Two Handbooks of Greek Mythology, Translated, with Introductions by R. Scott Smith and Stephen M. Trzaskoma, Hackett Publishing, 2007. . Google Books.

External links

 HYPNOS from The Theoi Project
 HYPNOS from Greek Mythology Link
 3D model of Bronze head of Hypnos via laser scan of a cast of British Museum's bronze.

Greek sleep deities
Chthonic beings
Night gods
Greek gods
Personifications in Greek mythology
LGBT themes in Greek mythology
Divine twins
Deities in the Iliad
Children of Nyx
Homosexuality and bisexuality deities
Greek underworld
Dreams in religion
Avian humanoids
Deeds of Zeus
Deeds of Hera